The posterior interosseous nerve (or dorsal interosseous nerve) is a nerve in the forearm. It is the continuation of the deep branch of the radial nerve, after this has crossed the supinator muscle. It is considerably diminished in size compared to the deep branch of the radial nerve. The nerve fibers originate from cervical segments C7 and C8 in the spinal column.

Structure

Course
It descends along the interosseous membrane, anterior to the extensor pollicis longus muscle, to the back of the carpus, where it presents a gangliform enlargement from which filaments are distributed to the ligaments and articulations of the carpus.

Supply
The posterior interosseous nerve supplies all the muscles of the posterior compartment of the forearm, except anconeus muscle, brachioradialis muscle, and extensor carpi radialis longus muscle. In other words, it supplies the following muscles:
 Extensor carpi radialis brevis muscle — deep branch of radial nerve
 Extensor digitorum muscle
 Extensor digiti minimi muscle
 Extensor carpi ulnaris muscle
 Supinator muscle — deep branch of radial nerve
 Abductor pollicis longus muscle
 Extensor pollicis brevis muscle
 Extensor pollicis longus muscle
 Extensor indicis muscle
The posterior interosseous nerve provides proprioception to the joint capsule of the distal radioulnar articulation, but not pain sensation.

Clinical significance
The posterior interosseous nerve may be entrapped at the arcade of Frohse, which is part of the supinator muscle. This nerve can be injured in Monteggia fracture due to dislocation of the proximal head of radius bone.

Posterior interosseous neuropathy is purely a motor syndrome resulting in finger drop due to no extension of IP joints and radial wrist deviation on extension.

See also
 Anterior interosseous nerve

References
.

Nerves of the upper limb